Garret Crossman, (born 7 December 1982) is an Australian former professional rugby league footballer who played in the 2000s and 2010s. Crossman previously played for the Hull Kingston Rovers in the Super League competition.

Early life
Born in Orange, New South Wales. Crossman played for Bloomfield Tigers and Orange Hawks before being signed by the Penrith Panthers.

Playing career
Crossman has previously played for the Penrith Panthers and Melbourne Storm.

He joined NRL side the South Sydney Rabbitohs from the 2009 season.  Crossman spent most of his time with the North Sydney Bears in the NSW Cup making a total of 24 appearances.

Crossman was in negotiations with a view to a moving to the Harlequins RL, before choosing to sign for the Hull Kingston Rovers and play in the Super League in 2008.

References

External links
NRL profile
RLeague.com Stats
Rabbitohs sign Garret Crossman for 2009 and 2010

1982 births
Living people
Australian rugby league players
Hull Kingston Rovers players
Melbourne Storm players
North Sydney Bears NSW Cup players
Penrith Panthers players
Rugby league players from Orange, New South Wales
Rugby league props
South Sydney Rabbitohs players